Gerónimo Vargas Aignasse is an Argentine politician, a Front for Victory member of the Argentine Chamber of Deputies representing Tucumán Province. He is the son of disappeared Peronist physicist and legislator Guillermo Vargas Aignasse.

Legislative task 
He was President of the Committee on Constitutional Affairs of the Honourable Legislature of Tucumán in the period 1999-2003. President of the Committee on Petitions, Powers and Regulations of the Tucumán Legislature in the 2007-2011 period. And he joined the Security and Justice Commission of the Honourable Legislature of Tucumán in the period 2011-2015. He was also a national deputy.

In his current period 2019-2023 he holds the position of First Vice President of the Honourable Legislature of Tucumán; He is the President of the Security and Justice Commission of the Honorable Lesgislature of Tucumán; President of the Environment Commission of the Honorable Legislature of Tucumán; Regular Director of the CAM (Advisory Council of the Magistracy)

References

Sources
 Presentó un proyecto contra el plagio, que beneficiaba a distintos sectores de la sociedad "

Living people
Members of the Argentine Chamber of Deputies elected in Tucumán
Children of people disappeared during Dirty War
Justicialist Party politicians
Members of the Legislature of Tucumán
Year of birth missing (living people)